Kieran Kramer is an American author of historical romance novels. Her Impossible Bachelor books are a series of Regency romances.

Her book When Harry Met Molly won the 2010 First Historical Romance Award from Romantic Times.

Bibliography
 When Harry Met Molly, St. Martin’s Press, 2010
 Dukes to the Left of Me, Princes to the Right, St. Martin’s Press, 2010
 Cloudy with a Chance of Marriage, St. Martin’s Press, 2011
 If You Give a Girl a Viscount, St. Martin’s Press, 2011
 Loving Lady Marcia, St. Martin’s Press, 2012
 The Earl Is Mine, St. Martin’s Press, 2013
 Say Yes to the Duke, St. Martin’s Press, 2013
 Sweet Talk Me, St. Martin’s Press, 2014
 You're So Fine, St. Martin’s Press, 2015
 Trouble When You Walked In, St. Martin’s Press, 2015
 A Wedding At Two Love Lane, St. Martin's Press, 2017

References

External links
 

Year of birth missing (living people)
Living people
American historical novelists
American women novelists
American romantic fiction novelists
Women romantic fiction writers
21st-century American novelists
21st-century American women writers
Women historical novelists